List of archaeological sites in Barishal Division of Bangladesh. According to the Department of Archaeology, there are 21 archaeological sites in the area.

List

See also
 List of archaeological sites in Bangladesh

References

Archaeological sites in Barishal Division